Raymond A. Sherwood (25 November 1889, in Brooklyn – 15 August 1965, in Arcadia, Florida) was an American lyricist of popular music of the Tin Pan Alley genre (circa early 1920s). Sherwood's World War I Draft Registration indicates that in June 1917, he worked as a salesman for Forster Music Publisher, Inc.  Forster, based in Chicago, at that time had an office at 116 West 42nd Street in Manhattan.

Selected compositions 

 Various publishers
 "Down Love's Old Way," words & music by Ray Sherwood, Samuel A. Massell, Brooklyn (pub.) (1915)
 "General Hooligan," words by Ray Sherwood, music by Harry Von Tilzer, Harry Von Tilzer Music Publishing Co. (1915) 
 "Oh, You Little Tootsie Roll," words by Ray Sherwood, music by Raymond Walker, P. J. Howley Music Co. (Patrick J. Howley; 1870–1918) (1917) 
 "Honeymoon Waltz," words by Ray Sherwood, music by Victor Arden, Triangle Music Pub. Co. (1919) 
 "She's the Heart of Dixieland," words by Ray Sherwood, music by Burt L. Rule, M. Witmark & Sons (1920) 
 "Repasz Band," song, founded on the Melody of the famous march of the same name, words by Ray Sherwood, music by Harry J. Lincoln, Jerry Vogel Music Co. (1920) 

 A. J. Stasny Music Co.
 "Down Where the Tennessee Flows," words by Ray Sherwood, music by Bert L. Rule (1913) 
 "I Did It All For You," words by Ray Sherwood, music by Bert L. Rule (1914) 
 "I'm Goin Back to Old Nebraska," words by Ray Sherwood, music by Bert L. Rule, cover artist Edward Henry Pfeiffer (1868–1932) (1914) 
 "There's a Girl That's Meant for Me: in the Heart of Tennessee," words by Ray Sherwood, music by Bert L. Rule (1914) 
 "Why Shouldn't I Love You," words by Ray Sherwood, music by Bert L. Rule (1915) 
 "Mr. Ford You've Got the Right Idea," words by Ray Sherwood, music by J. Fred'k Coots (1916) 
 "When I Dream Of The Girl Of My Dreams," words by Ray Sherwood, music by J. Fred'k Coots (1916)

 F. B. Haviland Pub. Co. Inc. (Frederick Benjamin Haviland; 1867–1932)
 "Are we downhearted? No! No! No!," words by Ray Sherwood, music by Will Donaldson (1917) 
 "There's a little Bit of Green in Everybody," words by Ray Sherwood, music by William Donaldson (1917) 
 "Sunshine," words by Ray Sherwood, music by William Donaldson (1918) 
 "I Haven't Mentioned Mammy," words by Ray Sherwood, music by Marion Schott (1926) 

 Forster Music Publisher, Inc.
 "Oh Johnny, Oh Johnny, Oh," words by Ed Rose, music by Abe Olman, patriotic lyrics by Ray Sherwood (1917) 
 "Climbing the Ladder of Love," words & music by Abe Olman, Ray Walker & Ray Sherwood (1917) 

 Vandersloot Music Publishing Company
 "General Pershing," words by James Royce Shannon & Ray Sherwood, music by Carl D. Vandersloot (1918) 
 "Forget Me Not My American Rose," words & music by Ray Sherwood (1918) 
 "When I dream About That Southern Home of Mine," words & music by Ray Sherwood (1918) 
 "Sliding Sid," a vocal spasm, words by Ray Sherwood, music by Abe Losch (pseudonym for Harry James Lincoln) (1919) 
 "The Great American (Theodore Roosevelt)," words by Ray Sherwood, music by Harry J. Lincoln (1919)  
 "Shadows," song, founded on the melodies of the Shadows Waltz,” words by Ray Sherwood, music by Howard Lutter (1919) 
 "Let Me Dream," words by Ray Sherwood, music by Curtis Gordon (1919) 
 "At the Wedding of the Lily and the Rose," words & music by Ray Sherwood (1919) 
 "In Shadowland," words by J. Stanley Brothers, Jr., & Ray Sherwood, music by J.S. Brothers, Jr. (1919)
 "Hold Me In Your Heart," waltz song, words by Ray Sherwood, music by Charley Straight (1920) 
 "Midnight," song, words by Ray Sherwood, music by Frank Banta & Carl D. Vandersloot (1920) 
 "Hawaiian Twilight," words by Ray Sherwood, music by Carl D. Vandersloot (1920) 
 "Some Little Girl," song - fox trot, words by Ray Sherwood, music by Carl D. Vandersloot, arranged by Frank E. Barry (1929) 
 "The American Legion," words by Ray Sherwood, music by Carl D. Vandersloot (1920) 
 "Spanish Moon," words & music by Ray Sherwood (1920)
 "The Waltz of Love," words by Ray Sherwood, music by Milo Rega (pseudonym for Fred Hager, musical director for Okeh Records) (1921) 
 "Somewhere in Honolulu," words by Raymond Sherwood, music by Carl D. Vandersloot and Harry J. Lincoln (1921)
 "In Tennessee," words by Ray Sherwood, music by Carl D. Vandersloot (1921) 
 "Dream Kiss," words by Ray Sherwood, music by Alfred J. Rienzo (1921) 
 "Dreamy Hawaii," words by Raymond Sherwood, music by F. W. Vandersloot (1921) 
 "Building Love Castles," words & music by Raymond Sherwood (1922) 
 "Hawaiian Slumbertime," words by Ray Sherwood, music by Carl D. Vandersloot (1922)
 "Sunset Valley," words by Raymond Sherwood, music by John W. Meyer (1922)
 "My Old Hawaiian Home," words by Raymond Sherwood, music by F. W. Vandersloot (1922) 
 "Lonesome Lips," a fox trot serenade, words by Ray Sherwood, music by Margie Kelly (1922) 
 "Happy," words by Ray Sherwood, music by Margie Kelly (1923)
 "Hawaiian Love Nest Song," words by Raymond Sherwood, music by F. W. Vandersloot (1924)
 "Hawaiian Sunset," words by Ray Sherwood, music by Carl D. Vandersloot (1925)
 "Dreamy Havana Moon Song," with Ukulele Arrangement, words by Ray Sherwood, music by F. W. Vandersloot (1926)

Family 
 Parents
Raymond Sherwood was the son of John A. Sherwood (b. Aug 1844, Ireland; d. 11 June 1915 Brooklyn) and Margaret McHale (maiden; b. Nov 1847 Ireland; d. 22 Apr 1916 Carbondale, Pennsylvania). John and Margaret were married in 1863.
 Siblings
Raymond Sherwood was the youngest of ten born to John and Margaret Sherwood:
 Brother, John A. Sherwood, Jr. (born 1866 Brooklyn)
 Brother, William G. Sherwood (b. June 1870 Brooklyn; d. Nov. 1870 Brooklyn)
 Brother, Charles Sherwood (born 1870 Brooklyn)
 Brother, Francis ("Frank") R. Sherwood (born Nov 1871 Brooklyn; d. 1948)
 Sister, Mary C. Sherwood (born May 1876 New York City)
 Sister, Eva Sherwood (b. 1879 Brooklyn; d 17 June 1880 Brooklyn)
 Sister, Gertrude Alice Sherwood (b. April 1881 New York City; d. 25 Nov 1930 Brooklyn), married 14 Aug 1912 in Brooklyn to Luke Patrick Irwin (born 18 Jan. 1877 New York City)
 Brother, Austin Sylvester Sherwood (born 21 July 1883 Brooklyn)
 Brother, Walter Edward Sherwood (born 29 September 1885 New York City)

 Spouse
Raymond Sherwood was married to Mary Josephine Sherwood ( Margaret Josephine Hines; b. 12 May 1901 Brooklyn; d. 6 Aug 1991) who is buried at Wauchula Cemetery, Wauchula, Florida.

 Death
Raymond Sherwood died as a patient at G. Pierce Wood Memorial Hospital in Arcadia, Florida, on August 15, 1965. At the time of his death, he resided at 407 Pecan Avenue, Wauchula.

References 

American lyricists
19th-century births
1965 deaths